Fear, Stress & Anger is a British sitcom that aired on BBC Two in 2007. Starring Peter Davison and Pippa Haywood, it was written by Michael Aitkens. There is no studio audience or laugh track.

Cast
Peter Davison – Martin Chadwick
Pippa Haywood – Julie Chadwick
Georgia Tennant – Chloe Chadwick
Daisy Aitkens – Lucy Chadwick
Eileen Essell – Gran
Jeff Rawle – Duncan Amis
Suzanne Burden – Sarah Amis
Katherine Parkinson – Gemma

Plot
Martin Chadwick is a middle-aged (born 1956) advertising executive whose job is downsized and he is forced to work at home, only having contact with one colleague, Gemma, via a webcam. Meanwhile, the Civil Service career of his wife Julie stagnates and his two twenty-something daughters, Chloe and Lucy refuse to leave home. Martin's elderly mother appears lost in another world. Martin and Julie's best friends are Duncan Amis, an author, and his wife Sarah who is a television actress. Martin and Julie try new jobs and therapy in order to cope with their life.

Episodes

Theme tune
Mcfly's cover of the Queen song "Don't Stop Me Now" accompanies the closing credits, while Queen's original accompanies the opening credits.

Trivia: Georgia Tennant is actually the daughter of Peter Davison (and Sandra Dickinson).

External links
 

2007 British television series debuts
2007 British television series endings
2000s British sitcoms
BBC television sitcoms
Television series by Hartswood Films